The following is a complete list of wars fought by Montenegro.

List
The list gives the name, the date, combatants, and the result of these conflicts following this legend:

Peacekeeping operations

References

Military history of Montenegro
Foreign relations of Montenegro
Montenegro
Wars